The Brain is a fictional character created by Leo Bachle for Bell Features, a Canadian comic company in the 1940s, and first appeared in Active Comics #1.

The muscular and often bare-chested Brain's secret identity was dashing, Toronto penthouse-dwelling Gordon Bell who, like the Wizard before him, had a moustache, superhuman strength and the clairvoyant ability to "visualize faraway happenings", the latter powers in his case gained due to a dying wish his father had made to a friendly spirit on a distant French battlefield during World War I.

While he first donned cape, tights and signature black skullcap-mask to battle Nazi agents, his adventures soon took on a more supernatural element, with him battling such inhuman adversaries as the sinister Dr. Coffin's ghoulish creation the Scarlet Zombie and the sadistic skull-faced and bandage-wrapped Mummy Man who possessed psychic powers that were more than a match for his own.

Friend and fellow artist Ross Saakel did a pint-sized parody of Bachle's character for Active Comics called The Noodle, a similarly caped and cowled two-fisted infant superhero complete with diapers and pacifier.

References

External links
 The Brain at International Catalog of Superheroes

Canadian comics
Canadian comics characters
1942 comics debuts
Comics characters introduced in 1942